Macrobrachium grandimanus, also called Hawaiian river shrimp or ʻopae ʻoeahaʻa in Hawaiian, is a species of shrimp. It has an amphidromous life cycle and is endemic to the Hawaiʻi islands.

Description 
The Hawaiian river shrimp is light to dark brown in color and grows to eight centimeters in length. It has asymmetric pincer claws unlike any other shrimps in Hawai'i. They scavenge at the bottom of slow flowing streams for animal and plant material. They reproduce year round with an incubation period lasting approximately three to four weeks. After hatching, the larvae gets washed down into the ocean where they spend a month developing before they return to streams to mature.

Distribution & Habitat 
Historic distribution includes all the main islands in Hawai'i that consist of everlasting streams. They currently can be found high quality streams in Kaua‘i, O‘ahu, Moloka‘i, Maui, and Hawai‘i as well as wetlands, small ponds, and closed off body of waters.

Human use 
Hawaiian river shrimp are not caught for food or used in any way.

References 

 Yamamoto M, Tagawa A. 2000. Hawaii’s native and exotic freshwater animals. Honolulu, HI: Mutual Publishing. 200 pp.
 De Grave, S., Cai, Y. & Wowor, D. 2013. Macrobrachium grandimanus (errata version published in 2019). The IUCN Red List of Threatened Species 2013: e.T197590A147784025. https://dx.doi.org/10.2305/IUCN.UK.2013-1.RLTS.T197590A147784025.en.
 ffish.asia. (2015, September). Macrobrachium grandimanus [Photograph]. https://ffish.asia/?page=file&pid=56425&lang=e
 dlnr.hawaii.gov. (2005, October). Freshwater Invertebrates. https://dlnr.hawaii.gov/wildlife/files/2019/03/SWAP-2015-Hawaiian-prawn-Final.pdf
 Wortham, Jennifer L.; Van Maurik, Lauren N. (2012-01-01). "Morphology and morphotypes of the Hawaiian river shrimp, Macrobrachium grandimanus". Journal of Crustacean Biology. 32 (4): 545–556. doi:10.1163/193724012x637311. ISSN 0278-0372.

Palaemonidae
Crustaceans of Hawaii
Crustaceans described in 1840